John Lammers (born January 29, 1986) is a Canadian professional ice hockey  forward who currently plays for ESV Kaufbeuren in the DEL2. He was selected by the Dallas Stars in the 3rd round (86th overall) of the 2004 NHL Entry Draft.

Playing career
He first joined the EBEL in the 2011–12 season with EC KAC after playing in the Czech Extraliga with HC Plzeň 1929.

After three seasons with Klagenfurt, Lammers opted to join rivals EC VSV on a one-year contract as a free agent on April 8, 2014. In the 2014–15 season with VSV, Lammers contributed with 13 goals and 36 points in 54 games.

On May 4, 2015, Lammers signed to remain in Austria on a one-year contract with his third EBEL club, HC TWK Innsbruck.

Career statistics

Regular season and playoffs

International

References

External links

1986 births
Abbotsford Heat players
Alaska Aces (ECHL) players
Ässät players
Dallas Stars draft picks
Everett Silvertips players
Houston Aeros (1994–2013) players
Idaho Steelheads (ECHL) players
HC TWK Innsbruck players
Iowa Stars players
EC KAC players
Lethbridge Hurricanes players
Living people
Manitoba Moose players
HC Plzeň players
Providence Bruins players
EC VSV players
Canadian ice hockey left wingers
Canadian expatriate ice hockey players in the Czech Republic
Canadian expatriate ice hockey players in Austria
Canadian expatriate ice hockey players in Finland
Canadian expatriate ice hockey players in the United States
Canadian expatriate ice hockey players in Germany
ESV Kaufbeuren players